The 2016 Dunlop Endurance Championship is a motor racing championship for GT cars, touring cars, sportscars and Production cars held across England. Cars compete in five classes with a car's class decided on horsepower, momentum, equipment, etc. It is the 14th season of a Britcar championship, the 5th run as the Britcar Endurance Championship and the 1st run as the Dunlop Britcar Endurance Championship. The championship began on 26 March at Silverstone and ended on 13 November at Brands Hatch.

Calendar
The 2016 calendar was announced on 5 January 2016. Each race would consist of one mandatory pit stop and a driver change.

Teams and drivers 
Cars are assigned classed based on speed, horsepower, momentum, equipment fitted to the car and the car's model;
Class 1: GT3, prototype cars
Class 2: Cup (one-make series) cars
Class 3: Cup (one-make series) and GT4 cars
Class 4: GT4, cup and touring cars
Class 5: Production cars

Results

Overall championship standings

Points are awarded as follows in all classes

(key)

Class championship standings 

Points are awarded as follows in all classes

(key)

Notes

References

External links 

Britcar
Britcar
Britcar Endurance Championship seasons